Abigail Elizabeth Mavity (born March 4, 1993) is an American actress who has appeared on a number of television series and commercials, as well as in feature films.

Life and career

Abigail was born in Mesa, Arizona, the youngest of ten children (her siblings are: Kevin, Shannon, Sara, Jake, Emily, Justin, Matt, Nate, and Nick). In January 1999 she moved from Arizona to Los Angeles to further her acting career.

Since that time, she has appeared regularly in numerous films and television shows, as well as many commercials and voice-over roles. She was nominated for a Young Artist Award in 2003 for her role as Kathy Martin on the series Haunted with Matthew Fox, and Mark Hoppus from the group Blink-182. She was also nominated for a Young Artist Award for her recurring role as Lisa Grubner on the Disney XD series Zeke and Luther. She has had leading parts in two Hallmark movies.

Filmography

Television

Film

Video games

L.A. Noire (2011) as Michelle Moller

External links

Interview at Portrait Magazine
Interview at Teen Magazine

1993 births
20th-century American actresses
21st-century American actresses
Actresses from Arizona
American child actresses
American film actresses
American television actresses
Living people
People from Mesa, Arizona